Serine/arginine repetitive matrix protein 2 is a protein that in humans is encoded by the SRRM2 gene.

Interactions 

SRRM2 has been shown to interact with Pinin.

References

Further reading